Kolibari is a village in the municipality of Kičevo, North Macedonia. It used to be part of the former Zajas Municipality.

Demographics
As of the 2021 census, Kolibari had 355 residents with the following ethnic composition:
Albanians 338
Persons for whom data are taken from administrative sources 17

According to the 2002 census, the village had a total of 747 inhabitants. Ethnic groups in the village include:
Albanians 742
Serbs 1 
Others 4

References

External links

Villages in Kičevo Municipality
Albanian communities in North Macedonia